George Dashwood may refer to:
 George Dashwood (1669–1706), Member of Parliament for Sudbury 1703–1705
 George Dashwood (1680–1758), Member of Parliament for Stockbridge 1710–1713
 Sir George Dashwood, 4th Baronet (1786–1861), Member of Parliament for Truro 1814–1818
 Sir George Dashwood, 5th Baronet (c.1790–1862), English landowner, Member of Parliament for Buckinghamshire 1832–1835 and Wycombe 1837–1863
 George Frederick Dashwood (1806–1881), public servant and politician in South Australia
 George Henry Dashwood (1801–1869), British antiquary